Onnum Valley is an ice-free valley between Derrick Peak and Onnum Ridge in Britannia Range. Named in association with Onnum Ridge by a University of Waikato (N.Z.) geological party, 1978–79, led by Michael Selby.

Further reading 
 MARTIN P. KIRKBRIDE, MARGARET A. BRADSHAW AND FRAKA J. HARMSEN, Further finds of the Derrick Peak meteorite, Transantarctic Mountains, and implications for terrestrial age, Meteoritics 26, 213-216 (1991)

Valleys of Oates Land